The Proscenium is a high-rise office building in Midtown Atlanta, United States. It is 24 stories tall.

History
It was constructed in 2001.

In October 2012 the Atlanta Business Chronicle reported that Carter's Inc. was likely to lease in the Phipps Tower in Buckhead for its headquarters. In December 2012 Carter's Inc. announced that it was moving its headquarters from Midtown Atlanta. The estimated value of the lease, except for concessions and escalation, was $70 million. The lease in Midtown was scheduled to be terminated on December 31, 2013. Manulife Financial Corp owns both the Proscenium and the Phipps Tower so Carter's terminated its lease early in one building and moved to the other.

In May 2013 Ionic Security signed a  lease.

Headquarters
Carter's, Inc. has its headquarters in Suite 900

References

External links

 The Proscenium
"Case Studies: The Proscenium." Newmark Grubb Knight Frank.

Skyscraper office buildings in Atlanta
Office buildings completed in 2001